The 1897 Lehigh football team was an American football team that represented Lehigh University as an independent during the 1897 college football season. In its first and only season under head coach Samuel M. Hammond, the team compiled a 3–7 record and was outscored by a total of 261 to 84.

Schedule

References

Lehigh
Lehigh Mountain Hawks football seasons
Lehigh football